Powellisetia paroeca is an extinct species of marine gastropod mollusc in the family Rissoidae. First described by Harold John Finlay in 1924, it is known to have lived in New Zealand during the early Miocene.

Taxonomy

The species was identified in 1924 by Harold John Finlay as a subspecies of Powellisetia prisca, and later described as a species in its own right.

Description

Finlay described both Powellisetia paroeca and Powellisetia prisca as follows:

Finlay noted some differences between the two groups, namely that Powellisetia paroeca "...differs from the species only in slightly higher spire and more regularly curved outer lip, which slants downwards from suture without any medial angulation."

Distribution

Fossils of the species have only been identified in New Zealand. The holotype was collected from sandstone at Calamity Point in Clifden, Southland, which dates to the early Miocene era.

References

Rissoidae
Gastropods described in 1924
Gastropods of New Zealand
Extinct animals of New Zealand
Miocene animals of Oceania
Miocene extinctions
Prehistoric gastropods
Molluscs of the Pacific Ocean
Taxa named by Harold John Finlay